The Third Texas Legislature met from November 5, 1849 to December 3, 1850 in its regular session and two called sessions. All members of the House of Representatives and about half of the members of the Senate were elected in 1849.

Sessions
 3rd Regular session: November 5, 1849 – February 11, 1850
 3rd First called session: August 12, 1850 – September 6, 1850
 3rd Second called session: November 18, 1850 – December 3, 1850

Party summary

Officers

Senate
 Lieutenant Governor John Alexander Greer, Democrat
 President pro tempore Edward Burleson, Democrat

House of Representatives
 Speaker of the House  Charles G. Keenan, Democrat

Members

Senate
Members of the Texas Senate for the Third Texas Legislature:

House of Representatives
Members of the House of Representatives for the Third Texas Legislature:

Membership Changes

Senate

  Campbell was elected in a special election on July 22, 1850.
  After his resignation, Taylor was reelected in a special election.

External links

3rd Texas Legislature
1849 in Texas
1850 in Texas
1849 U.S. legislative sessions
1850 U.S. legislative sessions